The Count of Monte Cristo is an American old-time radio adventure program. It was broadcast on the Don Lee Network on the West Coast in the 1944-1945 season and on the Mutual Broadcasting System December 19, 1946 - January 1, 1952.

Format
Derived from the novel The Count of Monte Cristo by Alexandre Dumas, the program focused on the adventures
of Edmond Dantes, who was sentenced to life in prison after being convicted on a false accusation of treason. Dantes escaped from prison and fought corruption in 18th-century France.

The episodes on the Don Lee Network were sponsored by Peralto Wines.

Personnel
Carleton Young had the title role. Rene Michon (the count's "faithful manservant") was portrayed first by Ferdinand Munier and later by Parley Baer. Actors who frequently had supporting roles included William Conrad, John Dehner, Virginia Gregg, Joseph Kearns, Barbara Lee, Paul Marion, Howard McNear, Jay Novello, Jack Petruzzi, and Vic Rodman. Announcers were Rod O'Connor, Charles Arlington, and Dick Wynn.

Thomas Freebairn-Smith directed the episodes on the Don Lee Network, and Jaime del Valle directed those on Mutual. Anthony Ellis was the writer. The orchestra was led by Dean Fossler.

References

External links

Logs
 Log of The Count of Monte Cristo episodes from Jerry Haendiges Vintage Radio Logs
 Log of The Count of Monte Cristo episodes from Old Time Radio Researchers Group

Streaming
 Episodes of The Count of Monte Cristo from Old Time Radio Researchers Group Library

1944 radio programme debuts
1952 radio programme endings
Mutual Broadcasting System programs
Don Lee Network programs
Works based on The Count of Monte Cristo
Period radio series